Michael van Langren (April 1598 May 1675) was an astronomer and cartographer of the Low Countries. Catholic, he chiefly found employment in the service of the Spanish Monarchy.

Family 
Michael van Langren was the youngest member of a family of Dutch cartographers. He was baptized on 27 April 1598 in Amsterdam.

His grandfather, Jacob van Langren, was born in Gelderland but moved to the Southern Netherlands and later to Amsterdam, where his sons Arnold and Hendrik were born. Unusually, each member of the family retained variations of Jacob's patronym Floresz rather than separate patronyms of their own. Jacob and his sons produced globes from 1580, both terrestrial and celestial.  A 1586 pair survives, the celestial globe based on astronomical data provided by Rudolf Snellius father of Willebrord Snellius, while Petrus Plancius collaborated on the 1589 edition. In 1592, the States General granted the Van Langren family a monopoly in the production of globes, which led to quarrels with Jodocus Hondius.

Arnold and Hendrik produced maps as well. Their world maps of the mid 1590s usually were drawn after maps by Plancius or Ortelius, but sometimes contained novelties based on recent discoveries such as depicting Nova Zembla as an island or Korea as a peninsula.

Arnold moved with his family, which included his sons Jacob and Michael, from Amsterdam to Antwerp around the year 1609, during the truce between the Spanish crown and the States General.

Michael van Langren did not receive a university education. He became a cartographer and engineer. He would serve as the Royal Cosmographer and Mathematician to King Philip IV of Spain, and was helped in his work by the patronage of Isabella Clara Eugenia. He died in May 1675 in Brussels.

Contributions 

Among his contributions were attempts to determine longitude. To show the magnitude of the problem, he created the first (known) graph of statistical data, showing the wide range of estimates of the distance in longitude between Toledo and Rome. He believed he could improve the accuracy of longitude determination, particularly at sea, by observing peaks and craters of the Moon as they appear and disappear, not only during eclipses of the Moon but also in the course of the entire lunation. This led him to make a map of the Moon (published in 1645), and he planned to produce maps of the Moon at thirty different phases, but never realized this plan. He was the first to assign names to various lunar features, but few of these names were widely accepted because they mostly corresponded to Catholic monarchs, scientists and artists.

He also published his observations of the comet of 1652, C/1652 Y1. He made various maps of the Spanish Netherlands, and produced plans for a port near Dunkirk, improvements to the port of Ostend, efforts to clear the canals of Antwerp, flood control concepts, and fortifications.

He named crater Langrenus on the Moon after himself, and the name has been preserved to our day.

External links
 The Galileo Project: Langren, Michael Florent van
 The Milestones Project: 1600s

Notes

References

Citations

Bibliography
 Michael Friendly, Pedro Valero-Mora, and Joaquín Ibáñez Ulargui, The First (Known) Statistical Graph: Michael Florent van Langren and the Secret of Longitude. The American Statistician, 2010, 64, 185–191.
 Johannes Keuning, The Van Langren Family. Imago Mundi 13 (1956) 101–109.
 Peter van der Krogt, Globi Neerlandici: The production of globes in the Netherlands (Utrecht, 1993), par. 3.2 Jacob Floris van Langren and his sons, and par. 7.3 Arnold Floris van Langren and his son Michael in Brussels.
 O. Van de Vyver S.J., Lunar Maps of the XVIIth Century. Vatican Observatory Publications 1, 2 (Vatican City, 1971).

1598 births
1675 deaths
17th-century Dutch astronomers
17th-century Dutch cartographers
Scientists from Amsterdam
Dutch celestial cartography in the Age of Discovery
Early modern Netherlandish cartography